Marundeeswarar Temple (மருந்தீஸ்வரர் கோயில்) (also called Idayatrunathar Temple) is a Hindu temple dedicated to the deity Shiva, located in T. Edaiyar, a village in Viluppuram district in the South Indian state of Tamil Nadu. Shiva is worshipped as Marundeeswarar, and is represented by the lingam. His consort Parvati is depicted as Balambigai. The temple is located on the Southern banks of Thenpennai River on the Thirukoilur - Thiruvennainallur road. The presiding deity is revered in the 7th century Tamil Saiva canonical work, the Tevaram, written by Tamil saint poets known as the nayanmars and classified as Paadal Petra Sthalam.

The temple complex covers an area of one acre and all its shrines are enclosed with concentric rectangular walls. The temple has a number of shrines, with those of Marundeeswarar and his consort Gnanambigai being the most prominent.

The temple has three daily rituals at various times from 6:00 a.m. to 8:30 p.m., and four yearly festivals on its calendar. Thayar Aaratu festival during the Tamil month of Thai (January - February) is the most prominent festival celebrated in the temple.

The original complex is believed to have been built by Cholas, while the present masonry structure was built during the 16th century. In modern times, the temple is maintained and administered by the Hindu Religious and Charitable Endowments Department of the Government of Tamil Nadu.

Legend and history

As per Hindu legend, sage Sukhabrahmma was overhearing the Sivarahasya, the secret that Shiva was telling his wife Parvathi in Kailasa. Shiva cursed the sage for the offence. The sage prayed to Shiva to propitiate his sins - Shiva was pleased by the devotion and gave him a boon that he would be born as sage Vyasa in his next birth. It is believed that sage Vyasa resided in this place and worshipped Shiva to relieve off his curse. As per another legend, sage Agastya installed and worshipped a Linga, which is called Agastya Linga. Another legend indicates that Somaskanda depiction is usually indicated with child Skanda (Muruga) depicted between Shiva and Parvathi. This temple has Bala Vinayaga in place of Skanda in the Somaskanda image.

The original complex is believed to have been built by Cholas, while the present masonry structure was built during the 16th century. There are inscriptions from later Chola emperors like Rajaraja Chola I (985–1014), Kulothunga Chola I (1070–1120) and Rajendra Chola III (1246–1279). There are inscriptions from Pandya kings like Maravarman Sundara Pandyan (1216–1238), Maarvarman Vikrama Pandiyan and Maravarman Veerpandiyan. The contributions of the kings of the Vijayanagara Empire like Achyuta Raya, Sadasiva Raya (1542–1570) and Rama Deva are also found in the inscriptions.

Architecture

The temple has a three-tiered gopuram, the gateway tower and all the shrines of the temple are enclosed in concentric rectangular granite walls. The central shrine is approached through the gateway tower, a flag post, a mukha mandapa and an Ardha mandapa, all of which are axial to the sanctum. The central shrine houses the image of Marundeeswarar in the form of Lingam. The shrine of Irulneeki Thayar (also called Anthaga Nivarini), facing West is located in a shrine behind sanctum. The central shrine is approached through a Mahamandapam and Arthamandapam. As in other Shiva temples in Tamil Nadu, the shrines of Vinayaka, Murugan, Navagraha, Chandekeswara and Durga are located around the precinct of the main shrine. There is a shrine of Agastheeswarar in the second precinct in the southeastern direction. The shrine of Gnanambigai is on the South Western corner of the temple facing East. The temple is so designed that the Sun rays fall directly on the image of Lingam during two days of April. The temple tree, Maruda maram, is located in the second precinct.

Religious importance and festivals

Tirugnana Sambandar, a 7th-century Tamil Saivite poet, venerated Idaiyatreeswarar in ten verses in Tevaram, compiled as the First Tirumurai. Sundarar, an 8th-century nayanmar, also venerated Idaiyatreeswarar in 10 verses in Tevaram, compiled as the Fifth Tirumurai. As the temple is revered in Tevaram, it is classified as Paadal Petra Sthalam, one of the 275 temples that find mention in the Saiva canon.

The temple priests perform the puja (rituals) during festivals and on a daily basis. The temple rituals are performed three times a day; Kalasanthi at 8:00 a.m., Uchikalam at 12:00 a.m. and Sayarakshai at 6:00 p.m. Each ritual comprises four steps: abhisheka (sacred bath), alangaram (decoration), naivethanam (food offering) and deepa aradanai (waving of lamps) for Marundeeswarar and Gnanambigai. The Thayar Aaratu festival during the Tamil month of Thai (January - February) is the most important festivals of the temple.

See also
 Kripapureeswarar Temple

References

External links

Padal Petra Stalam
Shiva temples in Viluppuram district